A Tamiya connector is a type of DC power connector, commonly used on radio-controlled model vehicle battery packs, drones and chargers. They are also commonly used on airsoft guns. The connector was designed by Japanese manufacturer Tamiya Corporation.

Wiring
The usual wiring has the positive (red) wire running to the terminal with a square profile, and the negative (black) wire running to the half-circle, half-square terminal. This is true for both genders of connector. The female sockets are in a male housing and the male pins are in a female housing. The male pins (female housing) connector is usually on the battery side.

In electrical and electronics engineering, the convention is that gender refers to the metal contact parts of a connector in order to avoid ambiguity. A large number of hobbyist retailers selling these connectors refer to the gender of the plastic housing, which is against convention and can lead to errors.  

In some cases, Mini-Tamiya connectors are wired in reverse polarity.  This is often the case with airsoft guns, where the square profile terminal is the negative terminal and the rounded terminal is the positive terminal.

Sizes
There are two sizes of Tamiya connectors: standard and mini.
The outside dimensions of the standard connector is:
 13.4mm x 5.4mm x 26.8mm
The outside dimensions of the mini connector is:
 9.9mm x 5.4mm x 22mm (about 3/8" x 7/32" x 7/8")
The standard Tamiya connector uses "D" cross-section sheaths for polarisation as seen in the male end above.  The mini-Tamiya connector uses one square and one or two round sheaths.

Advantages
A useful feature of the Tamiya connectors is the locking mechanism which prevents accidental disconnection.

The connector physically isolates the positive and negative wires so that the connectors remain safe to use in damp conditions. This makes them safe for use in relatively low-current applications (up to about 15 A) in dirty conditions (for example, model boats or RC cars used outdoors).

See also
 DC connector
 Electrical connector
 Anderson Powerpole
 Molex connector

References

External links

DC power connectors
Tamiya Corporation